Manganese(II,III) oxide is the chemical compound with formula Mn3O4. Manganese is present in two oxidation states +2 and +3 and the formula is sometimes written as MnO·Mn2O3. Mn3O4 is found in nature as the mineral hausmannite.

Preparation
Mn3O4 formed when any manganese oxide is heated in air above 1000 °C. Considerable research has centred on producing nanocrystalline Mn3O4 and various syntheses that involve oxidation of MnII or reduction of MnVI.

Reactions
 
Mn3O4 has been found to act as a catalyst for a range of reactions e.g. the oxidation of methane and carbon monoxide; the decomposition of NO, the reduction of nitrobenzene and the catalytic combustion of organic compounds.

Structure
Mn3O4 has the spinel structure, where the oxide ions are cubic close packed and the MnII occupy tetrahedral sites and the MnIII octahedral sites. The structure is distorted due to the Jahn–Teller effect. At room temperature Mn3O4 is paramagnetic, below 41-43 K, it is ferrimagnetic although this has been reported as reducing in nanocrystalline samples to around 39 K.

Uses
Mn3O4 is sometimes used as a starting material in the production of soft ferrites e.g. manganese zinc  ferrite, and lithium manganese oxide, used in lithium batteries.

Manganese tetroxide can also be used as a weighting agent while drilling reservoir sections in oil and gas wells.

References

Manganese compounds
Transition metal oxides
Mixed valence compounds